Sphingobium chlorophenolicum is a species of bacteria.

Sphingobium chlorophenolicum strain L-1 is of interest to researchers because it can mineralise the toxic pesticide pentachlorophenol (PCP).

See also
Sphingobium

References

External links 
Type strain of Sphingobium chlorophenolicum at BacDive -  the Bacterial Diversity Metadatabase

Sphingomonadales